The Belmont Turf Sprint Stakes is a Grade III American Thoroughbred horse race for three-year-olds and older run over a distance of six furlongs on the turf track held annually in October at Belmont Park in Elmont, New York. The event offers a purse of $200,000.

History

The event was inaugurated on 8 October 2016 as the seventh race under card event on Jockey Club Gold Cup Day and was won by Pure Sensation who defeated the Australian-bred Power Alert in a time of 1:07.10.

The event with its short history has attracted talented turf sprinters which have run in the event as a prep race for the Breeders' Cup Turf Sprint. The event was upgraded in relative short time to a Grade III event in 2020.

Prior to 2022 the event was held as an invitational event. In 2022 the event was moved to Aqueduct Racetrack due to infield tunnel and redevelopment work at Belmont Park.

Records
Speed  record: 
6 furlongs:  	1:06.97  – Disco Partner  (2017)

Margins:
5 lengths  – Dancing Buck  (2022)

Most wins:
 2 – Disco Partner  (2017, 2018)

Most wins by an owner:
 3 – Patricia A. Generazio  (2016, 2017, 2018)

Most wins by a jockey:
 3 – Irad Ortiz Jr. (2017, 2018, 2021)

Most wins by a trainer:
 3 – Christophe Clement (2016, 2017, 2018)

Winners

Legend:

See also
List of American and Canadian Graded races

References

Graded stakes races in the United States
Horse races in New York (state)
Grade 3 stakes races in the United States
Turf races in the United States
Open sprint category horse races
Recurring sporting events established in 2016
Belmont Park
2016 establishments in New York (state)